Point coloration is animal coat coloration with a pale body and relatively darker extremities, i.e. the face, ears, feet, tail, and (in males) scrotum. It is most recognized as the coloration of Siamese and related breeds of cat, but can be found in dogs, rabbits, rats, sheep, guinea pigs and horses as well.

In cats

Point coloration in cats originated in the Siamese and closely related Asian breeds, and is found in many Western-developed modern breeds. It is a form of partial albinism resulting from a mutation that affects tyrosinase, an enzyme involved with melanin production. The mutated enzyme is thermolabile; it fails to work at normal body temperatures, but becomes active in cooler areas of the skin. As a result, dark pigment is limited to the coldest areas of the body, that is, the extremities. Pointed kittens are born white, since the womb is uniformly warm. As the kitten ages, the cooler areas darken while warmer areas remain cream to white in color. Points are not limited to solid colors or dark colors. It is possible to have a red (orange color) or fawn (pale warm gray) point. It is also possible to have a tortoiseshell or tabby point. A cat (of any breed) with this coloration is often called a colorpoint cat to distinguish it from others.

As the expression of the gene responsible for the pointed pattern is regulated by temperature, pointed cats who live in cooler environments often show increased darkening of their fur relative to cats who live in warmer climates, sometimes even developing large dark areas along their sides.

Because of the pigment restriction caused by the temperature sensitive tyrosinase, pointed cat's eyes are always shades of blue because the blue layer in the eye common to all cats is not covered by another color. The back of the eye also lacks pigment, giving colorpoint cats' pupils an eerie red and silver reflection in the dark, unlike a normally pigmented cat's shining silver-green or -blue.

The point gene allele is at the C locus, where pure albinism is also carried, and is written as cs. Point is recessive, so two copies of cs, one from each parent, are needed for points to be expressed. Also carried on the C locus is the gene for the sepia pattern. This is the darkest of all of the pigment restricting patterns—pigment is only paled at the warmest point in the body: the abdomen. The sepia allele is represented by cb. When a cat carries the genes cs and cb, the mink pattern is formed, in which the pigment distribution is between sepia and point.

The lynx point pattern is formed by mating a colorpoint cat with a tabby cat (or breeding cats that already possess the lynx point pattern). It is characterized by a mixture of the darkening (reduced) of point coloration with distinct tabby striping on the head, tail, and legs, and an otherwise uniform and comparatively pale body. It is an accepted pattern in some cat registries, but not others, for particular breeds (mostly Siamese-related).

Point coloration is inherent to the Siamese breed and some other closely related breeds but with most other breeds the colorpoints (including lynx) were brought into some breed lines long after their establishment, but there are exceptions. For example, lynx point was a feature of some of the foundation stock of the Siberian.

Cat breeds

 Balinese
 Birman
 British Shorthair
 Colorpoint Shorthair
 Highlander
 Himalayan
 Javanese
 Napoleon
 Neva Masquerade (Pointed Siberian cat variety)
 Peterbald
 Ragamuffin 
 Ragdoll
 Siamese
 Snowshoe
 Sphynx
 Thai
 Tonkinese

In dogs

Tan points on dogs includes point coloration on a black or dark base coat with tan cheek spots, eyebrows, feet, forelegs and tail vent.  Typical tan point breeds include Dobermann and Rottweiler.

Rarely, dogs may also have a point coloration similar to that of Siamese cats.

In horses

In horses, point coloration is most often produced by the action of the agouti gene. It acts on the extension gene, when present, to suppress black color to all but the extremities of the horse; the legs, mane, tail and tips of the ears. If the extension gene is not present, the effect of agouti is not visible, as there is no black color present to suppress. Points are most typically seen on a bay-colored horse, which has a black mane, tail, legs, and ear tips while the body and head will show the underlying chestnut or "red" base color. 

Other genes white markings may affect a horse's coat color in addition to agouti, and if present, can further alter or suppress black hair color and may mask any point coloration. In particular, Gray horses are born dark and lighten with age; if born bay, they will eventually lose point coloration as the body hair silvers with age, though often the points are the slowest areas of the body to go gray. 

Point coloration may also be visible on horses with other dilution genes that act upon a bay base coat. These include:
 The cream gene, an incomplete dominant, that when heterozygous produces  Buckskin. When homozygous, even point coloration is mostly suppressed, the color is called perlino, and some individuals may have slightly redder hair at the traditional point coloration locations.  
 The Champagne gene, which on a bay base produces Amber Champagne.

A dilution gene that produces what looks like point coloration, but from a completely different genetic mechanism is the dominant Dun gene, which dilutes the color of the body coat but not the points, including primitive markings—a dorsal stripe down the back and,  less often, horizontal striping on the upper legs. On a bay base coat the dun gene leaves black points, producing a Bay Dun or "Zebra" Dun. But the gene also leaves the points dark when it appears with other base colors. These include the “blue dun” or grullo, which has a black base coat, and the red dun, which has a chestnut base coat. 

Similarly, darker coloration at the points is also preserved in horses with the roan gene, a patterning gene, producing a body coat of mingled white and dark hairs, but leaving the points the darker base color in all horses, not just those carrying agouti.  

Most other genes that produce spotting patterns or white markings allow point coloration produced by agouti to show except where masked by white depigmentation. There are not always separate names for a pattern over a bay base coat, but one exception is the Bay pinto, sometimes called ”tricoloured”.

In rabbits and rodents 

All pointed white rabbits of true breeding have red eyes. The pointed white rabbit is created with the ch gene. Its presentation is typified in the Himalayan rabbit breed (the first rabbit breed with a pointed white coat) and in the Californian breed.

Rabbit coat colors
Some rabbits that appear to be pointed white lack the red eyes, which indicates they are of different breeding. The following such coat colors are examples of those created, not with the ch gene, but with the cchl, cchd, or cchm gene in conjunction with the e gene:

 Blue point
 Chocolate point
 Lilac point
 Pearl
 Sable point
 Sallander
 Seal point
 Siamese

No pointed white rabbit can produce orange pigment; therefore, the points are always either black, blue, chocolate, or lilac. The resulting point coloration is sometimes in conjunction with a coat pattern, such as: white agouti, marten, broken, Vienna, or harlequin. (Such coats may not be recognized for showing.)

Rabbit breeds
Breeds of rabbit that include varieties with point coloration include:

 Altex
 American Fuzzy Lop
 English Angora
 French Angora
 Californian
 Cashmere Lop
 Himalayan
 Holland Lop
 Jersey Wooly
 Lionhead
 Mini Lop
 Mini Rex
 Mini Satin(in development)
 Netherland Dwarf
 Pointed Beveren
 Rex
 Satin
 Satin Angora

In fancy (domestic) rats 
The C - Albino locus gene causes dilution of yellow and black coloration, causing Himalayan or Siamese markings depending  on the allele is affected. 

Point colors in rats include:

 Sepia 
 Seal Point 
 Blue Point

In guinea pigs 
There is only one type of guinea pig with a pointed coat. It is called the Himalayan, has either Black (a very dark brown) or Chocolate, tipped on the Ears, Nose, and Feet.

In sheep

Some breeds of sheep exhibit point coloration.

Sheep breeds

 Clun Forest
 Dorset Down
 Hampshire
 Norfolk Horn
 Oxford
 Shropshire
 Suffolk
 Tunis
 Valais Blacknose
 Wensleydale

References

Cats
Animal coat colors
Horse coat colors